Almeric de Courcy, 23rd Baron Kingsale (1664–1720) was an Irish Jacobite.

Birth and origins 
Almeric was born in May 1664, the second son of John de Courcy and his wife Ellen MacCarthy Reagh. His father was the 21st Baron Kingsale. His father's family, the de Courcys, were Old English and claimed descendence from John de Courcy, who had arrived in Ireland in 1176. Almeric's first name evokes Almeric Tristram, a liegeman of John de Courcy and remote ancestor of the Earls of Howth.

His mother was a daughter of Charles MacCarthy Reagh. Her father's family were the MacCarthy Reagh, a Gaelic Irish dynasty that branched from the MacCarthy-Mor line with Donal Gott MacCarthy, a medieval King of Desmond, or with Donal Maol Cairprech MacCarthy, the first independent ruler of Carbery.

He had two brothers and at least one sister, who are listed in his father's article..

Baron Kingsale 
On 19 May 1667 his elder brother Patrick, a seven-year-old child, succeeded their father as 17th or 22nd Baron. However, Patrick's tenure lasted only two years. Almeric succeeded him in 1669 as the 18th or 23rd Baron Kingsale. King Charles II had bestowed a pension of £300 yearly on the 22th Baron, which was carried over to him.

Early life 
Kingsale was raised a Catholic by his parents but was then sent to Oxford for a Protestant education. Kingsale studied under Doctor John Fell, Dean of Christ Church and Bishop of Oxford. In a letter written in 1678 Fell complained that Kingsale was "addicted to the tennis court, proof against all Latin assaults and prone to kicking, beating and domineering over his sisters; ... fortified in the conceit that a title of honour was support enough, without the pedantry and trouble of book-learning."

On 6 December 1681 Kingsale fought a duel with Charles Livingston, 2nd Earl of Newburgh and had Patrick Sarsfield as his second.

When the Catholic King James II acceded the throne in 1685, he continued Kingsale's pension. Kingsale served as a captain in a troop of horse in the Irish army, later becoming Lieutenant Colonel of Patrick Sarsfield's regiment of horse. In 1689 he sat in the House of Lords of the Patriot Parliament.

He was attainted in 1691 but obtained the reversal of his attainder in 1692.

He sat in the House of Lords of the Irish parliament of 1692–1693, taking his seat on 25 October 1692.

In 1692 he exercised before William III his privilege, supposed to have been granted to his ancestor John in 1203, to remain covered before the king. He probably did this in London as William had left Ireland on 5 September 1690.

Marriage 
On 2 March 1698 Kingsale married Anne, daughter of Robert Dring, of Isleworth, Middlesex, at St Martin, Ludgate, London, in an Anglican ceremony.

Later life 
Kingsale sat again in the House of Lords during the Irish Parliament of 1703–1713 on 20 May 1712.

Death 
Kingsale died childless on 9 February 1720 and was buried in Westminster Abbey. His wife died on 25 April 1724. In her will, she provided for a monument to her husband. This took the form of a mural with a life-size effigy under a canopy that still stands in the north choir aisle. Its large size might be explained by the sympathy for Jacobites entertained by the then dean, Francis Atterbury.

Kingsale was succeeded by his cousin, Gerald de Courcy, 24th Baron Kingsale, the son of Miles de Courcy.

Notes and references

Notes

Citations

Sources 
Subject matter monographs:
Click here. Wills 1841 in Lives of Illustrious and Distinguished Irishmen
—

  – Monuments
 
  – Marriages, baptisms and burials from about 1660 to 1875
  – G to K (for Kingsale)
  – 1625 to 1649 (for Magrath)
  – Canonteign to Cutts (for Appendix D: Peers Present in and Absent from James II's Irish Parliament)
  – Hussey to Lincolnshire
 
  – (for timeline)
  – 1603 to 1860
 
  – Viscounts, barons
  – Normans, English, Huguenots etc.
 
 
  – (Snippet view)
 

1664 births
1720 deaths
17th-century Irish people
18th-century Irish people
Barons in the Peerage of Ireland
Burials at Westminster Abbey
Irish Jacobites
Irish people of French descent
Irish soldiers in the army of James II of England
Members of the Irish House of Lords
Politicians from County Cork
Politicians from County Dublin